Andinosaura hyposticta, Boulenger's lightbulb lizard, is a species of lizard in the family Gymnophthalmidae. It is endemic to Ecuador.

References

Andinosaura
Reptiles of Ecuador
Endemic fauna of Ecuador
Reptiles described in 1902
Taxa named by George Albert Boulenger
Taxobox binomials not recognized by IUCN